The 1995 Western Athletic Conference men's basketball tournament was held March 8–11 at The Pit at the University of New Mexico in Albuquerque, New Mexico.

Top-seeded Utah defeated defending champions  in the championship game, 67–54, to clinch their first WAC men's tournament championship.

The Utes, in turn, received an automatic bid to the 1995 NCAA tournament. They were joined in the tournament by BYU, who received an at-large bid to the tournament.

Format
No changes were made to the tournament format from the previous year. The top six teams received byes into the quarterfinal round, leaving the lowest four-seeded teams to play in the first round. Teams were seeded based on regular season conference records.

Bracket

References

WAC men's basketball tournament
Tournament
WAC men's basketball tournament
WAC men's basketball tournament